Degelia is a genus of lichen-forming fungi in the family Pannariaceae. The genus is named after Swedish lichenologist Gunnar Degelius.

The genus was circumscribed by Lars Arvidsson and David John Galloway in 1981.

Species
Degelia calcicola
Degelia crustacea
Degelia cyanoloma
Degelia durietzii
Degelia duplomarginata
Degelia flabellata
Degelia gayana
Degelia ligulata
Degelia neozelandica
Degelia periptera
Degelia plumbea
Degelia rosulata
Degelia subcrustata

References

 

Peltigerales
Lichen genera
Peltigerales genera
Taxa described in 1981
Taxa named by David Galloway (botanist)